The R360 is a Regional Route in the Northern Cape of South Africa that connects Upington with the Kalahari Gemsbok National Park (part of the Kgalagadi Transfrontier Park) and the Namibian border. It passes through Askham and Andriesvale.

Route
Its southern origin is a junction with the N10 at Upington, just west of the Upington Airport. From there, it heads north-west for 150 kilometres until it meets the R31 in the town of Askham. The two roads join and are co-signed for about 13 kilometres westwards, following the Kuruman River, up to the village of Andriesvale.

At Andriesvale, they cross the Molopo River (adjacent to its confluence with the Kuruman River) before splitting at a junction, where the R31 remains on the westerly road and the R360 becomes the road northwards. The R360 runs for 60 kilometres, bypassing the Gemsbok Border with Botswana and heading north along the western banks of the Nossob River, to reach the entrance to the Kgalagadi Transfrontier Park at Twee Rivieren Rest Camp. It heads north-west through the park along the Auob River's western banks to the Mata Mata Rest Camp. It then crosses the border into Namibia, where it continues as the C15.

External links
 Routes Travel Info

References

Regional Routes in the Northern Cape